Cheshmeh-ye Gholamali (also Romanized as Cheshmeh-ye Gholām‘alī) is a village in Ilat-e Qaqazan-e Sharqi Rural District, Kuhin District, Qazvin County, Qazvin Province, Iran. At the 2006 census, its population was 401, in 101 families.

References 

Populated places in Qazvin County